John Walker (15 September 1826 – 14 August 1885) was an English cricketer.

Walker was born in Palmers Green, the eldest of seven cricket playing brothers and four sisters - known historically as The Walkers of Southgate. He was educated in Stanmore and at Trinity College, Cambridge. He played as a right-handed batsman and an underarm right-arm slow bowler for Cambridge University (1846–1849), Marylebone Cricket Club (MCC) (1847–1863), a Middlesex XI (1850–1863) and Middlesex County Cricket Club (1864–1866).

His family owned a large estate at Arnos Grove and he founded the John Walker Cricket Ground, in Waterfall Road, Southgate. It is run today by the Walker Trust.

William Buttress, a fellow cricketer, was financially supported by Walker at certain times (due to the former's precarious career).

Walker died at Arnos Grove in 1885, aged 58.

References

External links
 Cricinfo
 Cricket Archive

1826 births
1885 deaths
English cricketers
Alumni of Trinity College, Cambridge
Cambridge University cricketers
Middlesex cricketers
People from Palmers Green
Gentlemen of the South cricketers
Marylebone Cricket Club cricketers
Gentlemen cricketers
Southgate cricketers
Gentlemen of England cricketers
Oxford and Cambridge Universities cricketers
John
Cricketers from Greater London
Gentlemen of Marylebone Cricket Club cricketers
All-England Eleven cricketers